Gergely Rusvay (born 15 August 1978 in Vác) is a Hungarian football player who currently plays for Vác.

References
HLSZ profile

1978 births
Living people
People from Vác
Hungarian footballers
Vác FC players
Association football midfielders
Nemzeti Bajnokság II players
Sportspeople from Pest County